Kuchta (Czech/Slovak feminine: Kuchtová) or Kukhta (Cyrillic: Кухта) is a surname. Notable people with the surname include:

Anton Kukhta (born 1991), Ukrainian football striker
Dana Kuchtová (born 1961), Czech politician
Frank Kuchta (1936–2017), American football player
Gladys Kuchta (1915–1998), American operatic soprano
Jan Kuchta (born 1997), Czech football player
Oleg Kukhta (born 1970), Russian singer-songwriter and actor
Pavlo Kukhta (born 1985), Ukrainian economist and politician
Tatsiana Kukhta (born 1990), Belarusian rower
Zygfryd Kuchta (born 1944), Polish handball player

See also